Edward S. Chinske (September 9, 1904 – June 27, 1967) was an American football, basketball, baseball, and golf coach.  He served as the head football coach at the University of Montana from 1952 to 1954, compiling a record of 8–18–1.  Chinske was also the head baseball coach at Montana from 1947 to 1952, tallying a mark of 69–62–1.

Chinske died on June 27, 1967, after suffering an apparent heart attack while playing golf in Missoula, Montana.

Head coaching record

College football

References

External links
 

1904 births
1967 deaths
American men's basketball players
Basketball coaches from Indiana
Basketball players from Indiana
College golf coaches in the United States
High school basketball coaches in Montana
High school football coaches in Montana
Montana Grizzlies baseball coaches
Montana Grizzlies basketball coaches
Montana Grizzlies basketball players
Montana Grizzlies football coaches
Montana Grizzlies football players
People from Michigan City, Indiana
Players of American football from Indiana